List of temporary broadcasting stations in the United States is a review of broadcasting stations which were not issued standard licenses, but instead were given temporary authorizations, to be used for special purposes and limited time periods. In a small number of cases these authorizations were followed by a standard license, or this represented a short-term revival of a previously licensed station. However, in most cases the stations expired immediately after their intended purpose was fulfilled.

Radio stations

References

External link
 "United States Temporary Broadcast Station Grants: 1922-1928"

Temporary